Thomas Maria Mamachi (December 4, 1713 in Chios – June 7, 1792 in Corneto, near Montefiascone), was an Italo-Greek Dominican theologian and historian.

Life
At the age of sixteen he entered the convent of Chios and passed later to St. Mark's at Florence and the Minerva at Rome.
 
In 1740 he was appointed professor of physics in the Roman Sapienza university, and in 1743 taught philosophy at the Propaganda Fide. His residence at Florence and Rome brought him into contact with brilliant men of his order, e.g. Giuseppe Agostino Orsi, Divelli and Daniello Concina, and greatly facilitated his progress in his studies. He collaborated with Orsi in his "De Romani pontificis in synodos oecumenicas et earum canones potestate".
 
Soon pope Benedict XIV appointed him prefect of the Casanatensian Library, master of theology and consultor of the Congregation of the Index. Owing to his office he had to take part in the controversy between the Appellants (Jansenists) and the Jesuits, and displayed an impartiality which greatly increased the difficulties of his anxious and laborious position. He engaged in lively theological controversies with Gian Domenico Mansi and Cadonici.
 
He had likewise to intervene in the controversy concerning the beatification of Juan de Palafox y Mendoza. In a published writing on this question, he dealt severely with the Jesuit party who opposed the beatification; but he was not less energetic in dealing with their opponents, the Appellants and Jansenist Church of Utrecht.
 
He was director of the ecclesiastical journal of Rome (1742–85), and established at his residence a reunion of the learned Roman society.

Mamachi was a zealous supporter of the power of the Roman Pontiff. Involved in all the controversy of the day, he was one of the first to take issue with Johannes Nicolaus Von Hontheim (Febronius). Pius VI made him secretary of the Index (1779) and afterwards Master of the Sacred Palace, and frequently availed himself of his advice and of his pen.

Writings
Mamachi's great work was to have been his "Christian Antiquities", but his labours in the field of dogma and jurisprudence absorbed so much of his time that he published only four of the twenty books that he planned. Moreover, he lived in an age when the good method inaugurated by Antonio Bosio had been abandoned and, considered as an archaeological work, the synthesis which he had projected is valueless. A second edition, however, appeared in 1842-1851.
 
His chief writings are:

Sources

External links 
 

18th-century Italian Roman Catholic theologians